Merwin Luther Hodel (May 27, 1931 – June 15, 1988) was an American football fullback who played one season with the New York Giants of the National Football League. He was drafted by the New York Giants in the fourth round of the 1952 NFL Draft. He played college football at the University of Colorado Boulder and attended Rockford West High School in Rockford, Illinois.

College career
Hodel played for the Colorado Buffaloes, earning First-team All-Big Seven honors in 1950 and 1951. He rushed for 597 yards and six touchdowns on 137 attempts his senior year in 1951. He was also hurdles champion of the Big Seven Conference.

Professional career

New York Giants
Hodel was selected by the New York Giants with the 38th pick in the 1952 NFL Draft. He spent the 1952 off-season with the Giants before leaving the team due to a foot injury. He later signed with the Giants on October 29, 1953 and played in two games for the team during the 1953 season.

References

External links
Just Sports Stats

1931 births
1988 deaths
Players of American football from Illinois
American football fullbacks
Colorado Buffaloes football players
New York Giants players
American male hurdlers
College men's track and field athletes in the United States
Sportspeople from Rockford, Illinois